{{DISPLAYTITLE:Upsilon3 Eridani}}

Upsilon³ Eridani (υ³ Eridani, abbreviated Upsilon³ Eri, υ³ Eri), officially named Beemim , is a star in the constellation of Eridanus. It is visible to the naked eye with an apparent visual magnitude of 3.96 The distance to this star, based upon an annual parallax shift of 11.01 mas, is around 296 light-years.

This is an evolved K-type giant star with a stellar classification of K4 III. It has about 54 times the radius of the Sun and radiates 426 times the solar luminosity from its outer atmosphere at an effective temperature of 3,990 K.

Nomenclature 

υ³ Eridani (Latinised to Upsilon³ Eridani) is the star's Bayer designation.

This star bore the traditional name Beemim (also rendered Beemin, Theemim and Theemin -- see Theemin). In 2016, the International Astronomical Union organized a Working Group on Star Names (WGSN) to catalog and standardize proper names for stars. The WGSN approved the name Beemim for this star on 30 June 2017 and it is now so included in the List of IAU-approved Star Names.

References

K-type giants
Eridanus (constellation)
Eridani, Upsilon3
Eridani, 43
028028
020535
01393
Durchmusterung objects